Thomas Matthew Champion (born 15 May 1986) is an English professional footballer who plays for Lewes.

Career

Early years
Born in London, Champion began his professional career with Barnet, after playing for Watford's youth setup. In February 2005, he joined Wealdstone on loan for a month. Champion subsequently returned to the Bees, and joined Bishop's Stortford in July.

Dartford
In the 2010 summer, after appearing regularly with Bishop's Stortford (and with a short stint at Braintree Town), Champion joined Dartford. He featured regularly for the side, also being an ever-present figure during the promotion campaign to the Conference Premier, featuring in 39 matches.

Cambridge United
On 8 May 2013 Champion joined Cambridge United, alongside Dartford teammate Tom Bonner. He appeared in all league matches during the season, helping the club return to League Two. On 8 August 2014 Champion played in Cambridge's first match back in League Two, starting in a 1–0 home win against Plymouth Argyle.

Barnet
Champion rejoined Barnet on a two-year deal in May 2015. He scored his first goal for the club in a 2–0 win during an FA Cup first round tie against Blackpool. Champion was made available for a free transfer at the end of the 2015–16 season, and joined Lincoln City on a 93-day loan on 12 September 2016. A month later his loan was cancelled early by mutual consent. Champion was released by the Bees at the end of the 2016–17 season. In total, he played 57 times, scoring two goals.

Boreham Wood
Champion joined Boreham Wood on a one-year deal in June 2017.

Woking
On 8 June 2021, Champion joined fellow National League side, Woking on a one-year deal. On 21 August 2021, Champion made his Woking debut during their 2–1 away victory over Wealdstone, replacing Max Kretzschmar in the 74th minute. He went onto feature thirty-eight times in all competitions before leaving at the end of his contract in July 2022.

Lewes
On 8 August 2022, it was announced that Champion had joined Lewes ahead of the 2022–23 campaign.

Career statistics

Honours
Cambridge United

FA Trophy: 2013–14

References

External links

Aylesbury United profile

1986 births
Living people
Footballers from the London Borough of Barnet
English footballers
Association football midfielders
Barnet F.C. players
Wealdstone F.C. players
Bishop's Stortford F.C. players
Dartford F.C. players
Braintree Town F.C. players
Cambridge United F.C. players
Lincoln City F.C. players
Boreham Wood F.C. players
Woking F.C. players
Lewes F.C. players
English Football League players
National League (English football) players